Durrette is a surname. It may refer to:

Mike Durrette (born 1957), American football player (offensive lineman) in the NFL
Wyatt Durrette (born 1938), American attorney and politician, who served in the Virginia House of Representatives
Wyatt Durrette (songwriter), born Wyatt B. Durrette III, American country music songwriter